Joseph M. Getty (born April 14, 1952) is the former chief judge of the Supreme Court of Maryland. He was appointed as a judge of that court on June 27, 2016, by Governor Larry Hogan. Effective September 11, 2021, Hogan appointed him as chief judge to replace Mary Ellen Barbera as she reached the mandatory retirement age of 70, an age Getty himself reached after seven months. He was succeeded by Matthew J. Fader.

Getty is a former state senator and delegate representing Maryland's 5th district. In February 2015, then-Senator Getty was appointed by Governor Larry Hogan to his cabinet, as legislative and policy director during his second term as senator. When Getty vacated his seat, he was replaced by former delegate, now Senator Justin Ready. Getty also served in former Governor Bob Ehrlich's cabinet in a similar capacity.

Joe Getty is also a regular contributor to the Northern News, which is a weekly newspaper that distributes to Hampstead, Manchester and Upperco, Maryland. He also previously served as the director of the Historical Society of Carroll County.

He is a graduate of the University of Maryland School of Law.

Task Force, boards and commissions
In 2012, Getty was appointed by Maryland legislative leaders to a task force to study the impact of a Maryland Court of Appeals ruling regarding the liability of owners of pit bulls and landlords that rent to them.

References 

|-

1952 births
Living people
20th-century American politicians
21st-century American judges
21st-century American politicians
Chief Judges of the Maryland Court of Appeals
George Washington University alumni
Judges of the Maryland Court of Appeals
Republican Party Maryland state senators
Republican Party members of the Maryland House of Delegates
People from Olney, Maryland
State cabinet secretaries of Maryland
University of Maryland Francis King Carey School of Law alumni
Washington College alumni